Ville-Marie is a Canadian drama film, directed by Guy Édoin and released in 2015.

The film stars Monica Bellucci as Sophie, a successful French film actress who is in Montreal to make a new film and to reconnect with her estranged gay son Thomas (Aliocha Schneider), whom she has not seen in three years due to her unwillingness to tell him anything about his father. However, the two are drawn into an unexpected tragedy when Thomas witnesses a young woman walking directly into oncoming traffic at a street corner, fatefully connecting their emotional difficulties to those of Pierre (Patrick Hivon), the paramedic who arrives to treat the young woman, and Marie (Pascale Bussières), the emergency department nurse on duty at the hospital.

The film premiered at the 2015 Toronto International Film Festival.

Cast 

 Monica Bellucci as Sophie Bernard
 Pascale Bussières as Marie Santerre
 Aliocha Schneider as Thomas
 Patrick Hivon as Pierre Pascal
 Louis Champagne as Benoit Tremblay
 Frédéric Gilles as Robert M.
 Stéphanie Labbé as Danica Bédard
 Marie-Évelyne Lessard as Dr. Robillard
 Sandrine Bisson as Serveuse au bar

See also
 List of lesbian, gay, bisexual or transgender-related films of 2015

References

External links 
 

2015 films
Canadian drama films
Canadian LGBT-related films
LGBT-related drama films
2015 LGBT-related films
Films set in Montreal
Films shot in Montreal
Films directed by Guy Édoin
French-language Canadian films
2010s Canadian films